Tetrasida is a genus of flowering plants belonging to the family Malvaceae.

Its native range is Bolivia and Peru.

Species:

Tetrasida chachapoyensis 
Tetrasida serrulata 
Tetrasida tulla 
Tetrasida weberbaueri

References

Malvaceae
Malvaceae genera